Fabien Patanchon (born 14 June 1983 in Bordeaux) is a French professional road bicycle racer who is currently unattached

Palmarès 

 Paris–Tours U23 (2005)
  Track Championships
 1st, Madison (2004-with Mathieu Ladagnous)
 2nd, Madison (2003–2005), Team Pursuit (2005)
  U23 Team Pursuit Champion (2005)
 European U23 Madison Champion (2003-with Mathieu Ladagnous)

External links 

French male cyclists
1983 births
Living people
Sportspeople from Bordeaux
Cyclists from Nouvelle-Aquitaine